Topsfield may refer to:

 Topsfield, Maine
 Topsfield, Massachusetts
 Topsfield (CDP), Massachusetts, a census-designated place
 Andrew Topsfield, Keeper of Eastern Art at the Ashmolean Museum